Battle Creek is a city in the U.S. state of Michigan, in northwest Calhoun County, at the confluence of the Kalamazoo and Battle Creek rivers. It is the principal city of the Battle Creek, Michigan Metropolitan Statistical Area (MSA), which encompasses all of Calhoun County. As of the 2020 census, the city had a total population of 52,731. Nicknamed "Cereal City", it is best known as the home of the Kellogg Company and the founding city of Post Consumer Brands.

Toponym
One local legend says Battle Creek was named after an encounter between a federal government land survey party led by Colonel John Mullett and two Potawatomi in March 1824. The two Potawatomi had approached the camp asking for food because they were hungry as the US Army was late delivering supplies promised to them under the 1821 Treaty of Chicago. After a protracted discussion, the Native Americans allegedly tried to take food. One of the surveyors shot and seriously wounded one Potawatomi. Following the encounter, the survey party retreated to Detroit. Surveyors would not return to the area until June 1825, after Governor Lewis Cass had settled issues with the Native Americans. Early white settlers called the nearby stream Battle Creek River and the town took its name from that.

Another folk etymology is attributed to the local river, which was known as Waupakisco by Native Americans. The Waupakisco or Waupokisco was supposedly a reference to a battle or fight fought between indigenous tribes before the arrival of Europeans. However, Virgil J. Vogel, professor emeritus of history and social science at Harry S. Truman College in Chicago, believes the native name has "nothing to do with blood or battle".

History
In about 1774, the Potawatomi and the Ottawa Native American tribes formed a joint village near the future Battle Creek, Michigan. The first permanent European settlements in Battle Creek Township, after the removal of the Potawatomi to a reservation, began about 1831. Westward migration from New York and New England had increased to Michigan following the completion of the Erie Canal in New York in 1824. Most settlers chose to locate on the Goguac prairie, which was fertile and easily cultivated. A post office was opened in Battle Creek in 1832 under Postmaster Pollodore Hudson. The first school was taught in a small log house about 1833 or 1834. Asa Langley built the first sawmill in 1837. A brick manufacturing plant, called the oldest enterprise in the township, was established in 1840 by Simon Carr and operated until 1903. The township was established by act of the legislature in 1839.

In the antebellum era, the city was a major stop on the Underground Railroad, used by fugitive slaves to escape to freedom in Michigan and Canada. It was the chosen home of noted abolitionist Sojourner Truth after her escape from slavery.

Battle Creek figured prominently in the early history of the Seventh-day Adventist Church. It was the site of a Protestant church founding convention in 1863. The denomination's first hospital, college, and publishing office would also be constructed in the city. When the hospital and publishing office burned down in 1902, the church elected to decentralize, and most of its institutions were relocated. The first Adventist church (rebuilt in the 1920s) is still in operation.

World Heavyweight Champion Jack Johnson was once arrested here for marrying his White wife and transporting her across state lines.

The city was noted for its focus on health reform during the late 1800s and early 1900s. The Battle Creek Sanitarium was founded by Dr. John Harvey Kellogg. In addition to some of his sometimes bizarre treatments that were featured in the movie The Road to Wellville, Kellogg also funded organizations that promoted eugenics theories at the core of their philosophical agenda, which was seen as a natural complement to euthenics. The Race Betterment Foundation was one of these organizations. He also supported the "separate but equal" philosophy and invited Booker T. Washington to speak at the Battle Creek Sanitarium in order to raise money. Washington was the author of the speech "The Atlanta Compromise", which solidified his position of being an accommodationist while providing a mechanism for southern Whites (and their sympathizers), to fund his school (the Tuskegee Institute).

W. K. Kellogg had worked for his brother in a variety of capacities at the B.C. Sanitarium. Tired of living in the shadow of his brother John Harvey Kellogg, he struck out on his own, going to the boom-towns surrounding the oilfields in Oklahoma as a broom salesman. Having failed, he returned to work as an assistant to his brother. While working at the sanitariums' laboratory, W.K. spilled liquefied cornmeal on a heating device that cooked the product and rendered it to flakes. He tasted the flakes and added milk to them. He was able to get his brother to allow him to give some of the product to some of the patients at the sanitarium, and the patients' demand for the product exceeded his expectations to the point that W.K made the decision to leave the sanitarium. Along with some investors, he built a factory to satisfy the demand for his "corn flakes".

It was during this time of going their separate ways for good that Dr. John Harvey Kellogg sued his brother for copyright infringement. The U.S. Supreme court ruled in W.K. Kellogg's favor, due to the greater sales and public profile of W.K. Kellogg's company.

Inspired by Kellogg's innovation, C. W. Post invented Grape-Nuts and founded his own cereal company in the town. Battle Creek has been nicknamed "the Cereal City."

In the turbulent 1960s, Battle Creek was not immune to the racial issues of the day. Dr. Martin Luther King spoke here, as did Sen. Hubert Humphrey, President L.B. Johnson, and Heavyweight Champion of the world Muhammad Ali. African Americans were subjected to "stop and frisk" procedures while walking, and housing covenants were in full force. No Blacks worked in the school systems, and only a few Blacks held mid-level manager posts in the local corporate sector. The Federal government sector was better at the Federal Center, and less so at the local Veterans' Administration Hospital.

The Black Recondos, a group formed from the local young adult council of the NAACP, forced the local board of education to hire Black teachers and administrative personnel, under the threat of removing every black student from their public schools. They also forced the chief of police to allow Black Recondos to intervene in arrests and gave them the authority to take black law breakers into their custody instead of the local police. This caused the second strike of a police force in U.S. history. The officers were fired and the strike was ended.

Geography

Approximately 60% of the city's land is developed. Of the undeveloped land, 38% is zoned agricultural, 26% is zoned general industrial, 17.5% is zoned residential, 16% is the Fort Custer Army National Guard Base/Industrial Park, and 2.5% is zone commercial.
After Battle Creek Township merged into the city of Battle Creek in 1983, the city's declining population rose by nearly 18,000 new residents. Prior to the merge, the city measured .
Battle Creek is variously considered to be part of West Michigan or Southern Michigan.

Climate

Nearby municipalities
 Bedford Charter Township
 Emmett Charter Township
 Pennfield Charter Township
 City of Springfield

Demographics

In 1982, at the insistence of the Kellogg Company, the city annexed Battle Creek Township, nearly doubling the city's population. Kellogg's even went so far as to threaten to move their headquarters if the annexation failed to occur.

2000 census
As of the census of 2000, there were 53,364 people, 21,348 households, and 13,363 families residing in the city. The racial makeup of the city was 74.7% White, 17.8% Black or African American, 1.9% Asian, 0.8% Native American, <0.1% Pacific Islander, 2.1% from other races, and 2.7% from two or more races. 4.6% of the population were Hispanic or Latino of any race.

In the 21,348 households 32.3% had children under the age of 18 living with them, 41.9% were married couples living together, 16.1% had a female householder with no husband present, and 37.4% were non-families. 31.6% of all households were made up of individuals, and 12.1% had someone living alone who was 65 years of age or older. The average household size was 2.43 and the average family size was 3.04.

In the city, 27.2% of the population was under the age of 18, 8.7% from 18 to 24, 29.5% from 25 to 44, 21.0% from 45 to 64, and 13.5% who were 65 years of age or older. The median age was 35 years. For every 100 females, there were 91.9 males. For every 100 females age 18 and over, there were 87.2 males.

The median income for a household in the city was $35,491, and the median income for a family was $43,564. Males had a median income of $36,838 versus $26,429 for females. The per capita income for the city was $18,424. About 10.7% of families and 14.4% of the population were below the poverty line, including 17.5% of those under age 18 and 11.8% of those age 65 or over.

2010 census 
As of the census of 2010, there were 52,347 people, 21,118 households, and 12,898 families residing in the city. The racial makeup of the city was 71.7% White, 18.2% African American, 0.7% Native American, 2.4% Asian, 2.7% from other races, and 4.3% from two or more races. Hispanic or Latino people of any race were 6.7% of the population.

In the 21,118 households 33.6% had children under the age of 18 living with them, 37.1% were married couples living together, 18.5% had a female householder with no husband present, 5.5% had a male householder with no wife present, and 38.9% were non-families. 32.6% of all households were made up of individuals, and 12.1% had someone living alone who was 65 years of age or older. The average household size was 2.41 and the average family size was 3.04.

The median age in the city was 36.3 years. 26.1% of residents were under the age of 18; 9% were between the ages of 18 and 24; 25.9% were from 25 to 44; 25.5% were from 45 to 64; and 13.4% were 65 years of age or older. The gender makeup of the city was 47.9% male and 52.1% female.

As of April 2013, Battle Creek had the fifth largest Japanese national population in the state of Michigan, with 358.

2020 census 
Nick Buckley wrote in the Battle Creek Enquirer: "The 2020 Census is critical for Battle Creek. Falling below the 50,000-resident threshold would mean a change from "urbanized area" to "urban cluster" and a loss of federal entitlement funding." Between the 2010 and 2020 censuses, Battle Creek's population grew from 52,347 to 52,731. There were 20,690 households and 2.40 residents per house, giving Battle Creek a population density (per square mile) of 1,228.6. 89.0% of those households had a computer and 82.8% had broadband internet connection. The city's racial makeup was 68.2% White, 17.3% African American, .6% Native American, 3.7% Asian, 8.1% from two or more races, and 7.9% Hispanic or Latino.

The median age in the city was 36.3 years. 7.0% of residents were under the age of 5; 25.8% were under 18; 15.2% were 65 and older. 51.5% of residents were female and 6.6% were foreign-born. 10.8% of people ages 5 and up speak at least one language other than English at home. Of persons 25 and up, 89.9% had a high school degree and 21.1% had a bachelor's degree or higher. Of those under 65, 11.2% had a disability and 6.1% lacked health insurance.

Median household income in 2020 dollars was $42,285, which works out to a $25,270 per capita income. 22.7% of the population lives in poverty. Median gross rent was $770 and the median value of the houses occupied by people who owned them was $91,700.

Government
The City of Battle Creek has a commission-manager form of government. Cities that follow this plan of government have an elected commission (or council) that appoints a professionally trained and experienced manager to administer the day-to-day operations of the city and to make recommendations to the city commission. Battle Creek also appoints a City Attorney, who provides legal counsel to the city manager and City Commission.

The City Commission makes all policy decisions, including review, revision, and final approval of the annual budget, which is proposed annually by the City Manager. The City Manager serves as an "at-will" employee and they work under an employment contract with the commission. All other city employees, except for the City Attorney's staff, are under the supervision of the City Manager.

There are five ward commissioners. Residents cast votes for a ward representative, who must live within the area they are representing, as well as for four at-large commissioners. These candidates may live anywhere in the city. All commissioners serve two-year terms and all terms begin and end at the same election.

Before November 2020, the commission held a special meeting to decide which commissioners served as the mayor and vice mayor for the next year. In March 2020, Battle Creek residents voted on a proposal that would change how the city selects its mayor position. This proposal (which passed) amended the city charter to allow residents to directly vote for the mayor. Residents will be able to vote for the mayor starting in the November 2020 general election. The mayor presides over the commission meetings and appoints commissioners and residents to special committees. He may also form special committees to explore community challenges or potential policies. The vice mayor stands in if the mayor is unavailable.

The city levies an income tax of 1 percent on residents and 0.5 percent on nonresidents.

Economy

Largest employers

According to the Battle Creek Unlimited October 2020 update, the thirty largest employers in the city are:

Education

Colleges and universities
 Kellogg Community College, a two-year college founded in 1956
 Robert B. Miller College, a four-year institution which shared KCC's facilities. The college closed in 2016.
 Western Michigan University's Battle Creek Branch — The Kendall Center
 Western Michigan University's College of Aviation, located at W.K. Kellogg Airport
 Spring Arbor University Battle Creek Branch
 Davenport University Battle Creek Campus. This campus of the college closed in 2015.
 Central Michigan University, Battle Creek Campus on Air National Guard Base, W.K. Kellogg Airport

Public school districts
 Battle Creek Public Schools
 Harper Creek Community Schools
 Lakeview School District
 Pennfield School District

High schools (public)
 Battle Creek Central High School
Harper Creek High School
Battle Creek Area Learning Center, better known as Calhoun Community High School
Lakeview High School, including Lakeview High School Library, a 2008 American Library Association award recipient
Michigan Youth Challenge Academy
Pennfield Senior High School

High schools (private)
Battle Creek Academy
Bedford Bible Church School
Calhoun Christian School
St. Philip Catholic Central High School

Secondary schools
 Battle Creek Area Mathematics and Science Center, an accelerated secondary school that focuses primarily on STEM education
 Calhoun Area Career Center, provides career and technical education to primarily 11th and 12th grade students

Foreign-language education
The Battle Creek Japanese School (バトルクリーク補習授業校 Batoru Kurīku Hoshū Jugyō Kō), a supplementary weekend Japanese school, holds its classes at the Lakeview School District building.

In 1980 the Western Michigan University Center for International Programs developed a program for Japanese expatriate K-12 students that was sponsored by Battle Creek Unlimited (BCU); the classes were held in the company facility at Fort Custer Industrial Park.

Culture

Print media
 The local daily newspapers are The Battle Creek Shopper and the newspaper of record is the Battle Creek Enquirer, owned and operated by Gannett Company.

Radio

FM radio stations that originate or can be heard over the air in Battle Creek:

 WSPB 89.7 - Battle Creek - Holy Family Radio Roman Catholic Radio
WCSG 91.3 - Grand Rapids           - Christian Adult Contemporary
 WZUU 92.5 - Mattawan/Kalamazoo - Classic Rock
 WBCT 93.7 - Grand Rapids           - Country
 WWDK 94.1 - Jackson/Lansing/Battle Creek/Kalamazoo   - Classic Country
 WBCK 95.3 - Battle Creek - News/Talk
 WZOX 96.5 - Portage/Kalamazoo      - Alternative Rock
 WNWN 98.5 - Coldwater/Battle Creek/Kalamazoo           - Country
 WFPM 99.1 - Battle Creek - Gospel
 WBCH-FM 100.1 - Hastings               - Country
 WBFN 101.1 - Battle Creek - Christian (FM translator for AM 1400)
 W274AQ 102.7 - Battle Creek - Classic Hits
 WKFR 103.3 - Battle Creek/Kalamazoo - CHR/Top 40
 WBXX 104.9 - Marshall/Battle Creek           - Alternative Rock
 WSRW 105.7 - Grand Rapids - Adult Contemporary
 WJXQ 106.1 - Jackson/Lansing/Battle Creek        - Mainstream Rock
 WVFM 106.5 - Kalamazoo - Adult Contemporary
 WRKR 107.7 - Portage/Battle Creek/Kalamazoo - Classic Rock

AM radio stations that originate or can be heard over the air in Battle Creek:

 WKZO 590 - Kalamazoo - News/Talk - (FM translator at 106.9)
 WFAT 930 - Battle Creek - Classic Hits
 WILS 1320 - Lansing - News/Talk
 WKMI 1360 - Kalamazoo - News/Talk 
 WBFN 1400 - Battle Creek - Christian
 WQLR 1660 - Kalamazoo - Sports

Television
 WWMT, a CBS affiliate licensed to Kalamazoo and also serving Battle Creek, Grand Rapids and western Michigan
 WOOD-TV, an NBC affiliate licensed to Grand Rapids and the default NBC station for Battle Creek.
 WOTV, an ABC affiliate serving Battle Creek, Kalamazoo, and southwestern Michigan, and also serving as a secondary ABC affiliate for Grand Rapids
 WXMI, the FOX affiliate from Grand Rapids.
 WZPX, an ION affiliate serving all of western Michigan
 WLLA, an independent station largely broadcasting religious programming from Kalamazoo.
 WGVK, the PBS channel from Grand Rapids but broadcasting from a satellite broadcaster in Kalamazoo.
 AccessVision, public-access television on Comcast channels 16 and 17; broadcasts to all municipalities within Battle Creek, and Newton Township

Festivals

 The World's Longest Breakfast Table
 The Battle Creek Field of Flight Entertainment Festival is an air show and balloon event held yearly in Battle Creek.
 International Festival of Lights

Music
Battle Creek is home to the Music Center, which serves South Central Michigan.

The Battle Creek Symphony Orchestra is based at the W.K. Kellogg Auditorium in downtown Battle Creek. The symphony is conducted by Anne Harrigan. It is Michigan's longest-running symphony orchestra.

The Brass Band of Battle Creek is composed of 31 brass players and percussionists from around the United States and Europe. "Created in 1989 by brothers Jim and Bill Gray, podiatrists and amateur brass players from Battle Creek, MI, the BBBC has grown to cult status in Battle Creek, where BBBC concerts are regularly sold out and waiting lists are created weeks in advance."

Leilapalooza - The Leila Arboretum Music Festival is a free summer music festival held at the Leila Arboretum. Proceeds benefit the Leila Arboretum Society and Kingman Museum.

Sports
Battle Creek hosts the annual Michigan High School Athletic Association team wrestling, volleyball, baseball, and softball state championships. The town receives quarterly boosts to its economy from the fans who flock there to follow their teams.

Each year, Battle Creek hosts the Sandy Koufax 13S World Series, for 13-year-old baseball players.

In August 2010, Battle Creek was host to the eighth edition of the International H.K.D. Games.

Sports teams

The Battle Creek Battle Jacks (formerly Bombers) are a collegiate baseball team, a member of the Northwoods League, who began play in 2007. After a last-place finish in 2010, the Bombers went 47–26 in 2011 and won their first NWL championship. It was the first championship in Battle Creek since 2000, when the Michigan Battle Cats won the Midwest League championship. The team's home is C.O. Brown Stadium. In 2011, the team signed a five-year lease, which guarantees the team's ten-year anniversary in Battle Creek in 2017. Actor Tyler Hoechlin, who starred alongside Tom Hanks in the critically acclaimed film Road to Perdition, previously played for the Battle Creek Bombers.

Former sports teams
The Michigan Battle Cats/Battle Creek Yankees/Southwest Michigan Devil Rays were a Class A minor league baseball team that played in the Midwest League from 1995 through 2006. The team's home was C.O. Brown Stadium.

The Battle Creek Crunch were a member of the Great Lakes Indoor Football League (GLIFL), that began play in 2006. They played one season in Battle Creek before ceasing operations due to financial trouble. The team's home was Kellogg Arena.

The Battle Creek Belles, a member of the All-American Girls Professional Baseball League, played two seasons, 1951 and 1952, before relocating to Muskegon.

The Battle Creek Revolution were a member of the All American Hockey League, a low-level professional minor league, from 2008 to 2011. The team's home was Revolution Arena. The organization also started a junior hockey team called the Battle Creek Jr. Revolution in 2010. The junior team was sold renamed to the West Michigan Wolves in 2014 before relocating to Lansing in 2017.

The Battle Creek Blaze is a not-for-profit, adult football team that plays NFL rules football as a member of the IFL (Interstate Football League). The Blaze organization raises funds and community awareness in the fight against cancer. They are in their sixth season of operation, and won the IFL North Division Championship in 2010.

The Battle Creek Cereal Killers roller derby team began in 2011.

The Battle Creek Knights are a minor league basketball team. They were a charter member of the International Basketball League (IBL) and went 21-0 during the league's first season in 2005, winning the championship. The team's home is Kellogg Arena. After announcing in July 2009 that they would sit out the 2009 season, that October the team announced that they would return to play in the International Basketball League.

In June 2019, the Federal Prospects Hockey League (FPHL) announced it had added a tenth team for the 2019–20 season and it would be in Michigan. On July 23, the Battle Creek Rumble Bees were announced with Adam Stio as the general manager after previously serving in the same role with the Southern Professional Hockey League's Evansville Thunderbolts. The FHL had played multiple neutral site games in Battle Creek over the previous seasons before placing an expansion team there. The Rumble Bees hired Clint Hagmaier as their first head coach, however, he was released after a 0–9 start to the season with Stio taking over as interim head coach. The Rumble Bees had a 1–45–0–2 record when the league's 2019–20 season was cancelled due to the coronavirus pandemic. Their losing streak led to them being named "the worst team in professional hockey". After the season, the team's players went to different teams in the FPHL as part of a dispersal draft.

Points of interest

 Art Center of Battle Creek
 Bailey Park & C.O. Brown Stadium
 Battle Creek Sanitarium (now the Hart–Dole–Inouye Federal Center)
 Battle Creek Tabernacle (Seventh-day Adventist Church)
 Binder Park Zoo
 Fort Custer Recreation Area
 Historic Adventist Village
 Kimball House Museum
Battle Creek Reginal History Museum 
 Kingman Museum and Planetarium
 Leila Arboretum
 Linear Park
 Willard Beach and Park
 Willard Library

Fort Custer Army National Guard Base
Founded in 1917, Camp Custer, as it was then known, served over the next decades as a training ground, from World War I until the present. Parts of the base were spun off and developed as the Battle Creek Veteran's Hospital, Fort Custer National Cemetery, Fort Custer Recreation Area and Fort Custer Industrial Park. This industrial park contains more than 90 different companies.

The United States Government still owns the land, under an arrangement by which the state of Michigan administers and manages the property. The base, which is still mostly undeveloped, wooded land, takes up a sizable portion of Battle Creek's land area. The part of the base in Battle Creek that is now the industrial park measures  in area, which is approximately 10.6% of the city's area. A much larger part of the base lies in Kalamazoo County. The adjoining W.K. Kellogg Airport is a joint civilian-Air National Guard facility.

Transportation
Battle Creek is situated on Interstate 94 (I-94) midway between Detroit and Chicago.

Railroad and bus lines

The Battle Creek Amtrak Station serves Amtrak trains on the south end of the station and Greyhound and Indian Trails bus lines on the north side of the station. The Canadian National Railway and Norfolk Southern Railway provide freight service to the city.

Public transportation
Battle Creek Transit provides public transit services to Battle Creek area residents. Regular route bus service is provided throughout the City of Battle Creek.

Major highways

Aviation
Kalamazoo's Kalamazoo-Battle Creek International Airport serves Battle Creek. Locally, W. K. Kellogg Airport serves the general aviation needs of the community. The airport is also home to Western Michigan University's College of Aviation, Duncan Aviation, WACO Classic Aircraft Corp. a bi-plane manufacturer, and formerly, the Michigan Air National Guard's 110th Attack Wing, which flies the MQ-9 Reaper UAV.

Notable people
See also People from Battle Creek, Michigan
 

 Lepha Eliza Bailey (1845−1924) - author and lecturer
Frankie Ballard - country music singer
 Lance Barber - television actor
 Johnny Bristol - Motown singer, songwriter and producer 
Nate Huffman - professional basketball player, 2001 Israeli Basketball Premier League MVP
 Betty Hutton - film actress
 John Harvey Kellogg - doctor and health food advocate
 Will Keith Kellogg - cereal mogul
 John Kitzmiller - film actor
 Tony McGee - National Football League lineman
 Dick Martin - comedian and actor
 S. Isadore Miner (1863–1916), American journalist, poet, teacher, feminist
 Jason Newsted - Bassist, played for Metallica from 1986 to 2001
 Lisa Rainsberger - Boston/Chicago Marathon winner.
 Mike Reilly - former Major League Baseball umpire
 Bob Rush - Major League Baseball pitcher
John Schwarz - Former United States House of Representatives
 Emma L. Shaw, editor
 Rick Snyder - former Governor of Michigan
 Sojourner Truth - abolitionist and women's rights activist
 Rob Van Dam - professional wrestler
 Junior Walker - Motown saxophonist and singer
 Tauren Wells - Grammy nominated Christian pop singer

Sister cities
Battle Creek has sister city relationships with Santo André, Brazil and Takasaki, Japan.

Battle Creek's relationship with Takasaki is more than 25 years old. Takasaki later established sister city relationships with Santo Andre; Chengde, China; Pilsen, Czech Republic and, in 2006, Muntinlupa, Philippines. These cities take turns hosting annual environmental conferences where technical and administrative staff share ideas and projects about environmental concerns. Battle Creek and Takasaki organize junior high and high school student and teacher exchanges each summer.

See also

References

External links

 
 Official tourism website
 

 
1831 establishments in Michigan Territory
Adventism in Michigan
Cities in Calhoun County, Michigan
Populated places established in 1831
Populated places on the Underground Railroad